Paintepur is a town and a Nagar panchayat in Sitapur district in the Indian state of Uttar Pradesh.The current Chairman of Nagar Panchayat is Mohammed Afzal.

Demographics
 India census,   Paintepur had a population of 13,917 comprising 7,182 males and 6,735 females giving a sex ratio of 938. Paintepur had an average literacy rate of 62.96%, lower than the state average of 67.68%, whilst, 2,199 of the population (15.8%) was under 6 years of age.

References

Cities and towns in Sitapur district